The Parker Ranch House was built near Laramie Peak in 1915 as a homestead in the Medicine Bow Mountains. The log structure incorporates design features that are unusual for Wyoming, more closely resembling structures found in the southeastern and south central United States. The ranch house was listed on the National Register of Historic Places in 1985.

References

External links
 Parker Ranch House at the Wyoming State Historic Preservation Office

National Register of Historic Places in Albany County, Wyoming
Houses completed in 1915